Wojciech Kamiński (born 21 January 2001) is a Polish professional footballer who plays as a midfielder for Odra Opole.

Career statistics

Club

Notes

References

2001 births
Living people
Sportspeople from Gliwice
Polish footballers
Poland youth international footballers
Association football midfielders
I liga players
II liga players
Piast Gliwice players
Bruk-Bet Termalica Nieciecza players
Sandecja Nowy Sącz players
Wigry Suwałki players
Zagłębie Sosnowiec players
Odra Opole players